It Came from the Closet may refer to:
 "It Came from the Closet", an episode of Bump in the Night (TV series)
 "It Came from the Closet", an episode of Pet Alien
 It Came from the Closet: Queer Reflections on Horror, a collection of essays edited by Joe Vallese